Fixed surnames were adopted in Wales from the 15th century onwards. Until then, the Welsh had a patronymic naming system.

History
In 1292, 48 per cent of Welsh names were patronymics and, in some parishes, over 70 per cent. Other names were derived from nicknames, a few non-hereditary personal names and, rarely, occupational names.

Patronymic names changed from generation to generation, with a person's baptismal name being linked by ap, ab (son of) or ferch (daughter of) to the father's baptismal name. For example, Evan, son of Thomas, would be known as Evan (ap) Thomas; Evan's son, John, would be John (ab) Evan; and John's son Rees would be Rees (ap) John.

Patronymics could be extended with names of grandfathers and earlier ancestors, to perhaps the seventh generation.  Names such as Llewelyn ap Dafydd ab Ieuan ap Gruffudd ap Meredydd were not uncommon. Those extended patronymics were essentially a genealogical history of the male line. The Encyclopaedia of Wales surmises that the system may have been Welsh law, in which it was essential for people to know how people were descended from an ancestor. These laws were decaying by the later Middle Ages, and the patronymic system was gradually replaced by fixed surnames, although the use of patronymic names continued up until the early 19th century in some rural areas.

In the reign of Henry VIII surnames became hereditary amongst the Welsh gentry, and the custom spread slowly amongst commoners. Areas where England's influence was strong had abandoned patronymics earlier, as did town families and the wealthy.

New surnames retained the ap in several cases, mainly in reduced form at the start of the surname, as in Upjohn (from ap John), Powell (from ap Hywel), Price (from ap Rhys), Pritchard (from ap Richard), and Bowen (from ab Owen). Alternatively, the ap was simply dropped entirely.

The most common surnames in modern Wales result from adding an s to the end of the name, as in Jones, Roberts and Edwards.  Patronymic surnames with the short -s form are recorded in various parts of England dating back to the Middle Ages. As most Welsh surnames are derived from patronymics and often based on a small set of first names, Welsh communities have families bearing the same surnames who are not related. It cannot be assumed that two people named Jones, even in the same village, must have inherited the surname from a common ancestor.

Present day
The stock of Welsh surnames is small. This is partly attributable to the reduction in the variety of baptismal names after the Protestant Reformation. Typical Welsh surnames – Evans, Jones, Williams, Davies, Thomas – were found in the top ten surnames recorded in England and Wales in 2000.

An analysis of the geography of Welsh surnames commissioned by the Welsh Government found that 718,000 people in Wales, nearly 35% of the Welsh population, have a family name of Welsh origin, compared with 5.3% in the rest of the United Kingdom, 4.7% in New Zealand, 4.1% in Australia, and 3.8% in the United States. A total of 16.3 million people in the countries studied had a name of Welsh origin.

It is not uncommon for five or more of the starting fifteen for the Wales international rugby team to be named Jones. For instance, all of the following played in the same period and are not immediately related to any of the others: Adam R. Jones, Dafydd Jones, Ryan Jones, Stephen Jones, Mark Jones, Adam M. Jones, Alun Wyn Jones, and Duncan Jones.

The prevalence of names such as Jones, Williams and Thomas brought a need for further distinction and in the 19th century a trend started for double surnames, created by prefixing the name of a house, parish or the mother's surname, as in "Cynddylan Jones". A hyphen was sometimes later introduced, for example "Griffith-Jones".

Revival of patronymics
Although the vast majority of Welsh surnames are family names, there has been a limited revival of patronymics in modern Wales, especially among Welsh speakers. Alternatively, given surnames are used, as in the case of the folk singer and political figure Dafydd Iwan (Dafydd Iwan Jones), opera singer Bryn Terfel (Bryn Terfel Jones), classical singer Shân Cothi, and the late actress Myfanwy Talog.

See also
Celtic onomastics
Irish name
Patronymic#Welsh and Cornish
Scottish Gaelic personal naming system
Welsh toponymy

References

External links
The meaning behind Welsh names 
Welsh patronymic naming system
Late Sixteenth Century Welsh Names 
Article on the relevance of surnames in genealogy (PDF File)
Welsh-Border Surnames from 'ab Edmond'
Article by genealogist Cat Whiteaway on tracing your Welsh ancestors

 
Welsh culture
History of Wales
Surname